Murexsul spiculus is a species of sea snail, a marine gastropod mollusk in the family Muricidae, the murex snails or rock snails.

Description
The length of the shell attains 10.2 mm.

Distribution
This species occurs in the Coral Sea
.

References

Houart, R., 1987. Description of three new muricid Gastropods from the south-western Pacific Ocean with comments on new geographical data. Bulletin du Muséum national d'Histoire naturelle 4(8)("1986"): 757–767

External links
  MNHN, Paris: Murexsul spiculus (holotype)

Muricidae
Gastropods described in 1987